The Mixed para-sport pairs at the 2014 Commonwealth Games, was part of the Lawn bowls category, which took place between 24 and 26 July 2014 at the Kelvingrove Lawn Bowls Centre.

Sectional play

Section A

Section B

Semifinals

Finals

Gold medal

Bronze medal

References

Mixed para-sport pairs